Edward A. Boyse FRS, AAAS, NAS(August 11, 1923 – July 14, 2007) was a British-born, American physician and biologist best known for his research on the immune system and pheromones.

Life 
Boyse was born in Worthing, England and studied medicine at the University of London.

Boyse joined the staff of Sloan-Kettering in New York City in 1962 following an appointment at New York University. He was a professor of biology at Cornell University Medical College between 1969 and 1989 and a professor at the University of Arizona between 1989 and 1994.

Boyse and others were among the earlier researchers to look at how the immune system responded to antigens using mice focussing on the role of white blood cells. In 1975, he won the Cancer Research Institute William B. Coley Award for distinguished research in immunology. in 1976 he won the Isaac Adler prize awarded jointly by Harvard and Rockefeller Universities. He later studied how animals can communicate through odors.  Boyse was the first to propose that umbilical cord blood could be used in place of bone marrow for hematopoietic reconstitution.
Boyse was a member of the National Academy of Sciences, a Fellow of the Royal Society, and a member of the American Academy of Arts and Sciences.

Boyse retired in Tucson, Arizona where he died in 2007 from pneumonia, aged 83.

References

1923 births
2007 deaths
British emigrants to the United States
American immunologists
Alumni of the University of London
New York University faculty
Cornell University faculty
University of Arizona faculty
People from Tucson, Arizona
People from Worthing
Members of the United States National Academy of Sciences
Fellows of the Royal Society